The 1972 EuroHockey Club Champions Cup was the fourth unofficial edition of Europe's premier field hockey club competition. It took place in Frankfurt, where it was won by host and defending champions SC 1880 Frankfurt.

Standings
  SC 1880 Frankfurt
  Eindhovense MHC
  Rüsselsheimer RK
  Slavia Prague
  CD Terrassa
  Royal Léopold Club
  Rot-Weiss Wettingen
  MDA Roma
  Lyon
  Lisnagarvey HC
  Harris Academy FP HC
  København

References

See also
European Hockey Federation

EuroHockey Club Champions Cup
International field hockey competitions hosted by Germany
EuroHockey Club Champions Cup
EuroHockey Club Champions Cup
1972 in European sport